Santiago de Anaya is a town and one of the 84 municipalities of Hidalgo, in central-eastern Mexico. The municipality covers an area of 316.1 km². The town is famous for its annual gastronomic festival, held for the last 37 years, featuring dishes prepared with plants and animals native to the region, including coyote, armadillo, rabbit, various snakes and xamues - long-legged plant-eating bugs. The festival, held during Easter week attracts thousands of tourists.

The original name of the town was Tlachichilco, which means "the painted land."

As of 2015, the municipality had a total population of 17,032, according to the most recent census by Mexico's National Statistics Institute (INEGI).

References

Municipalities of Hidalgo (state)
Populated places in Hidalgo (state)